RME may refer to:

Science and technology
 Rapeseed Methyl Ester, a form of biodiesel
 Receptor-mediated endocytosis, a biological process
 Rich Media Environment, an Open Mobile Alliance standard for broadcasting multimedia content
 Reaction mass efficiency, a metric to rate chemical reactions
 RME-6 or GAPVD1, a protein encoded by the GAPVD1 gene

Transport
 Ronsdorf-Müngstener Eisenbahn or Ronsdorf-Müngsten Railway, North Rhine-Westphalia, Germany; see Wuppertal-Ronsdorf station
 IATA Airport Code for Griffiss International Airport in Rome, New York

Other uses
 River Music Experience, in Davenport, Iowa
 ISO 639:rme, Angloromani language, spoken by the Romani people